The Horizon League Baseball Championship is the conference baseball tournament of the NCAA Division I Horizon League.  Through the 2019 season, all Horizon League baseball teams participated in the modified double-elimination tournament, which is hosted by the regular season champion of the league.  The winner of the tournament receives an automatic berth to the NCAA Division I Baseball Championship.

Champions

By year
The following is a list of conference champions and sites listed by year.

By school
The following is a list of conference champions listed by school.

Italics indicate that the program no longer fields a baseball team in the Horizon League.

References